Singles 06–07 is Jay Reatard's solo debut compilation LP album, released in 2008 on In The Red Records. This compilation is both a culmination of the sounds of Reatard's former punk and synth bands and a foray into more melodic pop rock and roll.

Track listing 
 "Night of Broken Glass"
 "Another Person"
 "All Over Again"
 "Feeling Blank Again"
 "I Know a Place"
 "Don't Let Him Come Back"
 "Hammer I Miss You"
 "It's So Useless"
 "All Wasted"
 "In the Dark"
 "Searching for You"
 "Haunting You"
 "Let It All Go"
 "Blood Visions"
 "Turning Blue"
 "It's So Easy"
 "Oh It's Such a Shame"

2008 compilation albums
Jay Reatard albums